was a daimyō during early-Edo period Japan. His courtesy title was Izumi-no-kami.

Biography
Aoyama Tadao was the second son of Aoyama Munetoshi, the daimyō of Hamamatsu Domain (Tōtōmi Province), and was born in Komoro, Shinano Province. On his father's death in 1679, he became 4th head of the Aoyama clan and daimyō of Hamamatsu Domain.

Aoyama Tadao was married to a daughter of Sanada Nobumasa, daimyō of Matsushiro Domain in Shinano Province. He died in 1685 at the relatively young age of 35 without a direct heir, and the succession went to Aoyama Tadashige, the son of his younger brother. His grave is at the temple of Daitoku-ji in Kyoto.

References 
 Papinot, Edmund. (1906) Dictionnaire d'histoire et de géographie du japon. Tokyo: Librarie Sansaisha...Click link for digitized 1906 Nobiliaire du japon (2003)
 The content of much of this article was derived from that of the corresponding article on Japanese Wikipedia.

Fudai daimyo
1651 births
1685 deaths
People from Nagano Prefecture